This page lists the public opinion polls that were conducted in relation to the 2014 Scottish independence referendum, that was held on 18 September 2014. Overall, polls showed that support for a "No" vote was dominant until the end of August 2014, when support for a "Yes" vote gained momentum and the gap closed significantly, with at least one poll placing the "Yes" vote ahead. In the final week of the campaign, polls showed the "No" vote to be consistently but somewhat narrowly ahead. There were no exit polls although a YouGov post-election poll was published shortly after the polls closed. For the history of the campaign itself see 2014 Scottish independence referendum, Yes Scotland ("yes" supporters), and Better Together (campaign) ("no" supporters).

Opinion polls conducted by British Polling Council members

Overview

Professor John Curtice stated in January 2012 that polling showed support for independence at between 32% and 38% of the Scottish population—this is a slight decline from 2007, when the Scottish National Party (SNP) first formed the Scottish Government. Up until January 2012, there was an insignificant amount of poll evidence showing majority support for independence, although the share "vehemently opposed to independence" declined.

Polls in March and April 2014 showed opposition to independence at an average of 55% (excluding those who registered a "Don't know" opinion), compared to 61% in the period before December 2013. During September 2014, the month of the referendum, the poll results appeared to narrow further—as of 11 September, the average opposition to independence stood at 51%.

A poll by Survation in April 2014 suggested that a high turnout in the referendum would be likely: 75% of respondents indicated that they were certain to vote in the referendum, compared to 63% for the next United Kingdom general election.

Results
Only polling companies that are members of the British Polling Council, and therefore fully disclose their findings and methodology, are shown in this section. Three methods of conducting polls were used by the polling companies for referendum polling. YouGov, Survation and Panelbase conducted polls online, although Survation's final poll was by telephone. Ipsos Mori conducted their polls by telephone, ICM conducted online and telephone polls for different clients and TNS BMRB used face to face interviews. There were variations in the questions used by each company, with TNS BMRB, ICM and Panelbase asking respondents how they intended to vote on 18 September 2014, while YouGov, Survation and Ipsos Mori asked their respondents how they would vote if the referendum were held immediately.

Headline figures from ICM, Panelbase, Survation and Ipsos MORI only showed those who say they are certain or very likely to vote in referendum. TNS BMRB and YouGov headline figures showed voting intention for all voters.

2014
{| class="wikitable sortable" style="text-align: center; line-height: 14px; font-size: 95%;"
! rowspan="2" |Date(s)conducted
! rowspan="2" |Polling organisation/client
! rowspan="2" |Sample size
!Yes
!No
! rowspan="2" |Undecided 
! rowspan="2" |Lead
|-
! class="unsortable" style="background: rgb(0, 129, 66); width: 100px; color: white;" | 
! class="unsortable" style="background: rgb(220, 36, 31); width: 100px; color: white;" |
|-
| data-sort-value="2014-09-17" style="background:#D5D5D5"| 18 September 2014 || style="background:#D5D5D5"| 2014 Scottish independence referendum results || style="background:#D5D5D5"| 3,623,344 || style="background:#D5D5D5"| 44.7% || style="background: rgb(220, 36, 31); color:white;" | 55.3% || style="background:#D5D5D5"|  || style="background: rgb(220, 36, 31); color: white;" | 10.6%
|-
| data-sort-value="2014-09-17" | 16–17 Sep || Ipsos MORI/Evening Standard|| 991|| 45% || style="background: rgb(233, 107, 103);" | 50% || 5% || style="background: rgb(220, 36, 31); color: white;" | 5%
|-
| data-sort-value="2014-09-17" | 16–17 Sep || Survation/Daily Record|| 1,160|| 43% || style="background: rgb(248, 193, 190);" | 48% || 9% || style="background: rgb(220, 36, 31); color: white;" | 5%
|-
| data-sort-value="2014-09-17" | 15–17 Sep || YouGov/The Times/The Sun|| 3,237 || 45% || style="background: rgb(248, 193, 190);" | 49% || 6% || style="background: rgb(220, 36, 31); color: white;" | 4%
|-
| data-sort-value="2014-09-17" | 15–17 Sep || Panelbase || 1,004 || 45% || style="background: rgb(233, 107, 103);" | 50% || 5% || style="background: rgb(220, 36, 31); color: white;" | 5%
|-
| data-sort-value="2014-09-16" | 15–16 Sep || Ipsos MORI/STV|| 1,373 || 47% || style="background: rgb(248, 193, 190);" | 49% || 5% || style="background: rgb(220, 36, 31); color: white;" | 2%
|-
| data-sort-value="2014-09-16" | 12–16 Sep || ICM/The Scotsman|| 1,175 || 41% || style="background: rgb(248, 193, 190);" | 45% || 14% || style="background: rgb(220, 36, 31); color: white;" | 4% 
|-
| data-sort-value="2014-09-16" | 12–16 Sep || Survation/Daily Mail|| 1,000 || 44% || style="background: rgb(248, 193, 190);" | 48% || 8% || style="background: rgb(220, 36, 31); color: white;" | 4% 
|-
| data-sort-value="2014-09-16" | 12–15 Sep || Opinium/Telegraph|| 1,156 || 43% || style="background: rgb(248, 193, 190);" | 47% || 8% || style="background: rgb(220, 36, 31); color: white;" | 4% 
|-
| data-sort-value="2014-09-12" | 10–12 Sep || Survation/Better Together|| 1,044 || 42% || style="background: rgb(248, 193, 190);" | 49% || 9% || style="background: rgb(220, 36, 31); color: white;" | 7% 
|-
| data-sort-value="2014-09-12" | 9–12 Sep || Panelbase/Sunday Times|| 1,014 || 46% || style="background: rgb(248, 193, 190);" | 47% || 7% || style="background: rgb(220, 36, 31); color: white;" | 1% 
|-
| data-sort-value="2014-09-11" | 11 Sep || colspan="8" | Broadcast of Scotland Decides: The Big, Big Debate
|-
| data-sort-value="2014-09-11" | 10–11 Sep || ICM/Sunday Telegraph|| 705 || style="background: rgb(153, 255, 153);" | 49% || 42% || 9% || style="background: rgb(0, 129, 66); color: white;" | 7%
|-
| data-sort-value="2014-09-11" | 9–11 Sep || Opinium/Observer|| 1,055 || 43% || style="background: rgb(248, 193, 190);" | 47% || 10% || style="background: rgb(220, 36, 31); color: white;" | 4% 
|-
| data-sort-value="2014-09-11" | 9–11 Sep || ICM/Guardian|| 1,000 || 40% || style="background: rgb(248, 193, 190);" | 42% || 17% || style="background: rgb(220, 36, 31); color: white;" | 2% 
|-
| data-sort-value="2014-09-11" | 9–11 Sep || YouGov/The Times/The Sun|| 1,268 || 45% || style="background: rgb(233, 107, 103);" | 50% || 5% || style="background: rgb(220, 36, 31); color: white;" | 5%
|-
| data-sort-value="2014-09-09" | 5–9 Sep || Survation/Daily Record || 1,000 || 42% || style="background: rgb(248, 193, 190);" | 48% || 10% || style="background: rgb(220, 36, 31); color: white;" | 6%
|-
| data-sort-value="2014-09-05" | 2–5 Sep || YouGov/The Sunday Times|| 1,084 || style="background: rgb(153, 255, 153);" | 47% || 45% || 7% || style="background: rgb(0, 129, 66); color: white;" | 2%
|-
| data-sort-value="2014-09-04" | 2–4 Sep || Panelbase/Yes Scotland|| 1,042 || 44% || style="background: rgb(248, 193, 190);" | 48% || 8% || style="background: rgb(220, 36, 31); color: white;" | 4%
|-
| data-sort-value="2014-09-04" | 27 Aug–4 Sep || TNS BMRB|| 990 || 38% || style="background: rgb(248, 193, 190);" | 39% || 23% || style="background: rgb(220, 36, 31); color: white;" | 1%
|-
| data-sort-value="2014-09-01" | 28 Aug–1 Sep || YouGov/The Times/The Sun || 1,063 || 42% || style="background: rgb(248, 193, 190);" | 48% || 10% || style="background: rgb(220, 36, 31); color: white;" | 6%
|-
| data-sort-value="2014-08-28" | 26–28 Aug || Survation/Scottish Daily Mail || 1,001 || 41% || style="background: rgb(248, 193, 190);" | 47% || 12% || style="background: rgb(220, 36, 31); color: white;" | 6%
|-
| data-sort-value="2014-08-25" | 25 Aug || colspan="8" | Broadcast of Scotland Decides: Salmond versus Darling
|-
| data-sort-value="2014-08-15" | 12–15 Aug || YouGov/The Times || 1,085 || 38% || style="background: rgb(233, 107, 103);" | 51% || 11% || style="background: rgb(220, 36, 31); color: white;" | 13%
|-
| data-sort-value="2014-08-15" | 12–15 Aug || Panelbase/Yes Scotland  || 1,026 || 42% || style="background: rgb(248, 193, 190);" | 46% || 12% || style="background: rgb(220, 36, 31); color: white;" | 4%
|-
| data-sort-value="2014-08-14" | 11–14 Aug || ICM/Scotland on Sunday || 1,005 || 38% || style="background: rgb(248, 193, 190);" | 47% || 14% || style="background: rgb(220, 36, 31); color: white;" | 9%
|-
| data-sort-value="2014-09-11" | 11 Aug || colspan="8" | Publication of The Wee Blue Book 
|-
| data-sort-value="2014-08-07" | 6–7 Aug || Survation/Scottish Daily Mail || 1,010 || 37% || style="background: rgb(233, 107, 103);" | 50% || 13% || style="background: rgb(220, 36, 31); color: white;" | 13%
|-
| data-sort-value="2014-08-07" | 4–7 Aug || YouGov/The Sun || 1,142 || 35% || style="background: rgb(233, 107, 103);" | 55% || 10% || style="background: rgb(220, 36, 31); color: white;" | 20%
|-
| data-sort-value="2014-08-07" | 23 Jul–7 Aug || TNS BMRB  || 1,003 || 32% || style="background: rgb(248, 193, 190);" | 45% || 23% || style="background: rgb(220, 36, 31); color: white;" | 13%
|-
| data-sort-value="2014-08-05" | 5 Aug || colspan="8" | Broadcast of Salmond & Darling: The Debate
|-
| data-sort-value="2014-08-03" | 28 Jul–3 Aug || Ipsos MORI/STV || 1,006 || 40% || style="background: rgb(233, 107, 103);" | 54% || 7% || style="background: rgb(220, 36, 31); color: white;" | 14%
|-
| data-sort-value="2014-08-01" | 30 Jul–1 Aug || Survation/Mail on Sunday || 1,000 || 40% || style="background: rgb(248, 193, 190);" | 46% || 14% || style="background: rgb(220, 36, 31); color: white;" | 6%
|-
| data-sort-value="2014-07-28" | 16–22 Jul || Panelbase/Sunday Times || 1,041 || 41% || style="background: rgb(248, 193, 190);" | 48% || 11% || style="background: rgb(220, 36, 31); color: white;" | 7%
|-
| data-sort-value="2014-07-11" | 7–11 Jul || ICM/Scotland on Sunday || 1,002 || 34% || style="background: rgb(248, 193, 190);" | 45% || 21% || style="background: rgb(220, 36, 31); color: white;" | 11%
|-
| data-sort-value="2014-07-09" | 25 Jun–9 Jul || TNS BMRB  || 995 || 32% || style="background: rgb(248, 193, 190);" | 41% || 27% || style="background: rgb(220, 36, 31); color: white;" | 9%
|-
| data-sort-value="2014-07-08" | 4–8 Jul || Survation/Daily Record || 1,013 || 41% || style="background: rgb(248, 193, 190);" | 46% || 13% || style="background: rgb(220, 36, 31); color: white;" | 5%
|-
| data-sort-value="2014-06-29" | 25–29 Jun || YouGov/The Times || 1,206 || 35% || style="background: rgb(233, 107, 103);" | 54% || 12% || style="background: rgb(220, 36, 31); color: white;" | 19%
|-
| data-sort-value="2014-06-23" | 10–23 Jun || TNS BMRB/Scotland September 18 || 1,004 || 32% || style="background: rgb(248, 193, 190);" | 46% || 22% || style="background: rgb(220, 36, 31); color: white;" | 14%
|-
| data-sort-value="2014-06-16" | 16 Jun || colspan="8" | Release of the draft Scottish Independence Bill consultation paper
|-
| data-sort-value="2014-06-16" | 12–16 Jun || YouGov/The Sun || 1,039 || 36% || style="background: rgb(233, 107, 103);" | 53% || 11% || style="background: rgb(220, 36, 31); color: white;" | 17%
|-
| data-sort-value="2014-06-12" | 9–12 Jun || ICM/Scotland on Sunday || 1,002 || 36% || style="background: rgb(248, 193, 190);" | 43% || 21% || style="background: rgb(220, 36, 31); color: white;" | 7%
|-
| data-sort-value="2014-06-11" | 9–11 Jun || Panelbase/Yes Scotland || 1,060 || 43% || style="background: rgb(248, 193, 190);" | 46% || 12% || style="background: rgb(220, 36, 31); color: white;" | 3%
|-
| data-sort-value="2014-06-10" | 6–10 Jun || Survation/Daily Record || 1,004 || 39% || style="background: rgb(248, 193, 190);" | 44% || 17% || style="background: rgb(220, 36, 31); color: white;" | 5%
|-
| data-sort-value="2014-06-02" | 2 Jun || colspan="8" | Release of Scottish Conservatives Strathclyde Commission Report
|-
| data-sort-value="2014-06-01" | 26 May–1 Jun || Ipsos MORI/STV || 1,003 || 36% || style="background: rgb(233, 107, 103);" | 54% || 10% || style="background: rgb(220, 36, 31); color: white;" | 18%
|-
| data-sort-value="2014-05-30" | 30 May || colspan="8" | Official Campaign Period begins
|-
| data-sort-value="2014-05-28" | 21–28 May || TNS BMRB  || 1,011 || 30% || style="background: rgb(248, 193, 190);" | 42% || 28% || style="background: rgb(220, 36, 31); color: white;" | 12%
|-
| data-sort-value="2014-05-15" | 12–15 May || ICM/Scotland on Sunday || 1,003 || 34% || style="background: rgb(248, 193, 190);" | 46% || 20% || style="background: rgb(220, 36, 31); color: white;" | 12%
|-
| data-sort-value="2014-05-14" | 8–14 May || Panelbase/Sunday Times || 1,046 || 40% || style="background: rgb(248, 193, 190);" | 47% || 13% || style="background: rgb(220, 36, 31); color: white;" | 7%
|-
| data-sort-value="2014-05-12" | 9–12 May || Survation/Daily Record || 1,003 || 37% || style="background: rgb(248, 193, 190);" | 47% || 17% || style="background: rgb(220, 36, 31); color: white;" | 10%
|-
| data-sort-value="2014-05-02" | 23 Apr–2 May || TNS BMRB  || 996 || 30% || style="background: rgb(248, 193, 190);" | 42% || 28% || style="background: rgb(220, 36, 31); color: white;" | 12%
|-
| data-sort-value="2014-04-28" | 25–28 Apr  || YouGov/Channel 4 || 1,208 || 37% || style="background: rgb(233, 107, 103);" | 51% || 12% || style="background: rgb(220, 36, 31); color: white;" | 14%
|-
| data-sort-value="2014-04-16" | 14–16 Apr || ICM/Scotland on Sunday || 1,004 || 39% || style="background: rgb(248, 193, 190);" | 42% || 19% || style="background: rgb(220, 36, 31); color: white;" | 3%
|-
| data-sort-value="2014-04-15" | 11–15 Apr || Survation/Sunday Post  || 1,001 || 38% || style="background: rgb(248, 193, 190);" | 46% || 16% || style="background: rgb(220, 36, 31); color: white;" | 8%
|-
| data-sort-value="2014-04-09" | 4–9 Apr || Panelbase/Yes Scotland || 1,024 || 40% || style="background: rgb(248, 193, 190);" | 45% || 15% || style="background: rgb(220, 36, 31); color: white;" | 5%
|-
| data-sort-value="2014-04-07" | 4–7 Apr || Survation/Daily Record || 1,002 || 37% || style="background: rgb(248, 193, 190);" | 47% || 16% || style="background: rgb(220, 36, 31); color: white;" | 10%
|-
| data-sort-value="2014-04-04" | 28 Mar–4 Apr || Panelbase/Wings Over Scotland || 1,025 || 41% || style="background: rgb(248, 193, 190);" | 46% || 14% || style="background: rgb(220, 36, 31); color: white;" | 5%
|-
| data-sort-value="2014-04-02" | 21 Mar–2 Apr || TNS BMRB  || 988 || 29% || style="background: rgb(248, 193, 190);" | 41% || 30% || style="background: rgb(220, 36, 31); color: white;" | 12%
|-
| data-sort-value="2014-03-24" | 20–24 Mar  ||YouGov/The Times || 1,072 || 37% || style="background: rgb(233, 107, 103);" | 52% || 11% || style="background: rgb(220, 36, 31); color: white;" | 15%
|-
| data-sort-value="2014-03-21" | 17–21 Mar || ICM/Scotland on Sunday || 1,010 || 39% || style="background: rgb(248, 193, 190);" | 46% || 15% || style="background: rgb(220, 36, 31); color: white;" | 7%
|-
| data-sort-value="2014-03-18" | 18 Mar || colspan="8" | Release of Scottish Labour Devolution Commission Report
|-
| data-sort-value="2014-03-14" | 7–14 Mar || Panelbase/Newsnet Scotland || 1,036 || 40% || style="background: rgb(248, 193, 190);" | 45% || 15% || style="background: rgb(220, 36, 31); color: white;" | 5%
|-
| data-sort-value="2014-03-09" | 26 Feb–9 Mar || TNS BMRB  || 1,019 || 28% || style="background: rgb(248, 193, 190);" | 42% || 30% || style="background: rgb(220, 36, 31); color: white;" | 14%
|-
| data-sort-value="2014-03-07" | 6–7 Mar || Survation/Daily Record/Better Nation || 1,002 || 39% || style="background: rgb(248, 193, 190);" | 48% || 13% || style="background: rgb(220, 36, 31); color: white;" | 9%
|-
| data-sort-value="2014-02-28" | 24–28 Feb || YouGov/Scottish Sun || 1,257 || 35% || style="background: rgb(233, 107, 103);" | 53% || 12% || style="background: rgb(220, 36, 31); color: white;" | 18%
|-
| data-sort-value="2014-02-25" | 20–25 Feb || IpsosMORI/STV || 1,001 || 32% || style="background: rgb(233, 107, 103);" | 57% || 11% || style="background: rgb(220, 36, 31); color: white;" | 25%
|-
| data-sort-value="2014-02-21" | 18–21 Feb || Panelbase/Scottish National Party || 1,022 || 37% || style="background: rgb(248, 193, 190);" | 47% || 16% || style="background: rgb(220, 36, 31); color: white;" | 10%
|-
| data-sort-value="2014-02-21" | 17–21 Feb || ICM/Scotland on Sunday || 1,004 || 37% || style="background: rgb(248, 193, 190);" | 49% || 14% || style="background: rgb(220, 36, 31); color: white;" | 12%
|-
| data-sort-value="2014-02-18" | 17–18 Feb || Survation/Scottish Daily Mail || 1,005 || 38% || style="background: rgb(248, 193, 190);" | 47% || 16% || style="background: rgb(220, 36, 31); color: white;" | 9%
|-
| data-sort-value="2014-02-13" | 13 Feb || colspan="8" | Chancellor of the Exchequer's speech on currency union|-
| data-sort-value="2014-02-06" | 29 Jan–6 Feb || Panelbase/Sunday Times || 1,012 || 37% || style="background: rgb(248, 193, 190);" | 49% || 14% || style="background: rgb(220, 36, 31); color: white;" | 12%
|-
| data-sort-value="2014-02-06" | 28 Jan–6 Feb || TNS BMRB  || 996 || 29% || style="background: rgb(248, 193, 190);" | 42% || 29% || style="background: rgb(220, 36, 31); color: white;" | 13%
|-
| data-sort-value="2014-02-05" | 3–5 Feb || YouGov/The Sun || 1,047 || 34% || style="background: rgb(233, 107, 103);" | 52% || 14% || style="background: rgb(220, 36, 31); color: white;" | 18%
|-
| data-sort-value="2014-01-31" | 29–31 Jan || Survation/Mail on Sunday || 1,010 || 32% || style="background: rgb(233, 107, 103);" | 52% || 16% || style="background: rgb(220, 36, 31); color: white;" | 20%
|-
| data-sort-value="2014-01-27" | 21–27 Jan || YouGov || 1,192 || 33% || style="background: rgb(233, 107, 103);" | 52% || 15% || style="background: rgb(220, 36, 31); color: white;" | 19%
|-
| data-sort-value="2014-01-24" | 21–24 Jan || ICM/Scotland on Sunday || 1,004 || 37% || style="background: rgb(248, 193, 190);" | 44% || 19% || style="background: rgb(220, 36, 31); color: white;" | 7%
|-
| data-sort-value="2014-01-20" | 14–20 Jan || TNS BMRB || 1,054 || 29% || style="background: rgb(248, 193, 190);" | 42% || 29% || style="background: rgb(220, 36, 31); color: white;" | 13%
|-
| data-sort-value="2014-01-20" | 3–10 Jan || TNS BMRB/BBC Scotland  || 1,008 || 28% || style="background: rgb(248, 193, 190);" | 42% || 30% || style="background: rgb(220, 36, 31); color: white;" | 14%
|}

2013

2012

2011

Other public polling

Two-option polling by other organisations
Some opinion polls were conducted by organisations that were not members of the British Polling Council and therefore not obliged to fully disclose their findings and methodology.

† The question should Scotland be an independent country? was the 26th asked question out of a total of 26.

Regional polling
ComRes conducted polls for ITV Border, surveying people in the council areas of Scottish Borders and Dumfries and Galloway on how they would vote in an immediate referendum.

Three-option polling
Before the Edinburgh Agreement clarified that the referendum would be a straight yes or no question on the issue of independence, some three option opinion polls were conducted. The third option in these polls was some (undefined) form of increased devolution. YouGov occasionally asked the question following the Edinburgh Agreement.

Demographic polling

Polling indicated higher support for independence among male voters, voters under the age of 55 and voters from economically deprived areas, compared to higher support for the Union among female voters, voters over the age of 55 and voters living in affluent areas.

In June 2013, a poll of over 1,000 14- to 17-year-olds conducted by the University of Edinburgh found that 21% supported independence, 60% supported the Union, and 19% were undecided. Only 17% of the teenagers' households said they would vote yes in the referendum, however, which led the Newsnet Scotland website to question the accuracy of the opinion poll. A similar poll by the University of Edinburgh in June 2014 found that support for independence was 29%, opposition 52% and 19% were undecided.

Polling on individual topics
A survey by Ipsos Mori for STV News in June 2014 found that 51% of voters thought that Yes Scotland had been the more effective campaign, compared to 23% who thought that Better Together had performed better.

Opinion polling showed a majority in favour of giving control of welfare policy to the Scottish Parliament.

Early in 2013, an opinion poll commissioned by the Press and Journal'' found 8% of people in Shetland and Orkney supported the islands themselves becoming fully independent countries, with 82% against.

Polling on hypothetical situations
Opinion polls also asked for attitudes in various hypothetical situations, such as if how would voters would view the referendum if they believed that the Conservatives or Labour were likely to win the 2015 UK general election. An ICM poll in April 2014 found that the no lead would be 8 points (44–36) if voters thought Labour would win, while the no lead would be 1 point (42–41) if they thought the Conservatives would win. Other hypothetical scenarios included if voters thought the UK was likely to leave the European Union, and if people believed independence would make them £500 better or worse off per year. In August 2013, a Panelbase poll commissioned by pro-independence blog Wings Over Scotland asked voters various questions, such as whether they would vote to join the Union in the hypothetical scenario that Scotland was already an independent country. 18% of voters said they would join the Union, whereas 55% of voters said they would choose for Scotland to remain independent.

Private polling
In June 2013, private research conducted on behalf of Yes Scotland reportedly showed "evidence of growing support for independence" among women and young people, based on "a sample several times the size of a conventional poll" and "a well-designed series of questions building on a rolling monthly basis going back to last January". Better Together demanded that a full report of the research should be published, but Yes Scotland refused to publish it on the basis that private research is not covered by British Polling Council regulations. The SNP researched voting intentions for the referendum while canvassing in Aberdeen Donside for the 2013 by-election; their survey showed 34% of people intending to vote for independence, 29% of people intending to vote for the Union and 37% undecided. The SNP also researched voting intentions for the referendum before the 2014 Cowdenbeath by-election.

A poll by the Scottish Tourism Alliance of members attending its annual conference in March 2014 found 60% would vote no and 32% would vote yes. A poll by Carrington Dean of 1,042 teens aged between 15 and 17 showed 64 percent of them to be worried about the outlook for the economy in an independent Scotland, against only 17 percent who were not concerned.

The Communication Workers Union (CWU) conducted two polls in April 2014, showing that 60% of its Scottish members would vote 'no', with 26.3% saying 'yes'.

In January 2014, the UK Government spent £46,500 on private opinion polling to be conducted by Ipsos MORI. By July 2014, the UK Government had spent £299,100 on opinion polls regarding Scottish independence during 2014.

School, college and university surveys
Schools, colleges and universities across Scotland conducted polls and mock referendums to gauge the opinion of pupils and students.  In September 2013, a survey of over 11,000 Aberdeenshire schoolchildren eligible to vote in the referendum returned 75.5% against independence, with 19 out of 20 schools involved voting 'no'. In June 2014, a survey of 964 Moray senior pupils eligible to vote in the referendum voted against independence by 71%, with 7 out of 8 schools involved voting 'no'.

Polling in the rest of the United Kingdom
Opinion polls were also conducted in the rest of the United Kingdom in relation to the Scottish independence referendum. People in the rest of the United Kingdom were polled on a variety of issues such as further devolution for Wales, an English parliament, the Trident nuclear missiles, and currency.

A February 2012 opinion poll in Wales showed a rise in support for stronger powers for its National Assembly if Scotland should choose to be independent. A poll on the same subject in June 2014 found that 61% of Welsh voters thought Scottish independence should make no difference to the constitutional position of Wales, while 17% favoured greater devolved powers and 14% supported independence for Wales. Professor Roger Scully of Cardiff University said it was possible that this poll showed that Welsh voters placed greater importance on the union between England and Wales, rather than the unity of the whole United Kingdom. A poll of Welsh voters in April 2014 found 62% were opposed to Scottish independence, with 16% in favour.

A YouGov survey conducted in April 2014 found that although clear majorities of English (59% – 19%) and Welsh (61% – 19%) voters were opposed to Scottish independence, the majority of English voters (56%) and a plurality of Welsh voters (48%) supported cutting the amount of public spending in Scotland. Commenting on the poll, Professor Scully said that it showed that although English and Welsh voters had a similar view on the question of Scottish independence, the English were tougher in their attitude to future relations within the UK.

The British Social Attitudes Survey conducted in 2013 found that a majority (63%) in England and Wales thought that the Trident nuclear missiles should either definitely or probably be moved from an independent Scotland, which was greater than the number in Scotland who thought that the UK should be required to move the missiles. Professor Curtice said this was probably because the English and Welsh public would prefer to have the missiles in their territory, rather than holding them in another state. Majorities in the survey also favoured allowing an independent Scotland to have the same monarch as England (65%) and to continue using the BBC (82%).

Polls in both Scotland and the rest of the United Kingdom by Panelbase showed majority support for a televised debate between British Prime Minister David Cameron and Scottish First Minister Alex Salmond. A poll of FTSE 100 company chairmen found that 65% believed Scottish independence would be bad for business, while 24% believed it would be good.

Currency
A number of polls amongst English and Welsh people were conducted to ascertain feelings on Scotland continuing to use the Pound Sterling - be it as part of a currency union or not. Although the question varied in some of the polls, the YouGov question asked: "If Scotland did become independent would you support or oppose an independent Scotland continuing to use the pound as their currency?" The Guardian/ICM poll asked "If Scotland becomes independent, the residual UK should: Refuse a currency union, negotiate a currency union or don't know?"

Although the rest of the United Kingdom did not have a vote on Scottish independence, the proposal of a currency union by the Yes campaign was rejected by the British government and the Bank of England. Some writers speculated that in the event of independence, a currency union would have been a key issue in the 2015 UK general election and may require a referendum.

YouGov conducted some polls in the rest of the United Kingdom asking whether an independent Scotland should be allowed to form a currency union with them. In November 2013, 43% opposed a currency union and 38% supported it. In February 2014, after George Osborne said that a currency union would not be allowed, opposition to a currency union increased to 58%. A further poll in April 2014 found that 53% of respondents were opposed to a currency union, with 26% in favour. A Guardian/ICM poll in September 2014, on the eve of the referendum, found that disagreement had increased further. 63% of English and Welsh people believing that the United Kingdom should refuse to negotiate a currency union, while 27% supported the idea of a currency union.

An opinion poll commissioned by the SNP in December 2013 found that 71% of respondents in England, Wales, and Northern Ireland agreed that "if independence does happen [...] Scotland and the rest of the UK should continue using the pound in an agreed sterling area". The annual British Social Attitudes Survey found that, in the summer of 2013, a total of 69% of people in England and Wales thought that an independent Scotland should either definitely (38%) or probably (31%) be allowed to continue to use sterling. Professor John Curtice said that this suggested the later opinion polls showing opposition to a currency union were the result of UK politicians saying it was a bad idea, rather than the public being opposed in principle.

Historical Polling

Two-way polling
Respondents were asked "In a referendum on independence for Scotland, how would you vote?", with the options "I agree that Scotland should become an independent country" and "I do not agree that Scotland should become an independent country". These polls indicated the following levels of support for Scotland to be an independent country each year:

Three-way polling
During the late 1970s and 1980s, MORI conducted opinion polls on whether Scots wanted full independence, devolution or the status quo. During this period, devolution was the preferred option in each opinion poll, although support for independence increased.

Four-way polling
Between 1988 and 1995, MORI polled voters on independence giving four opinions: independence inside the European Economic Community (European Union after 1992), independence outside the organisation, devolution and the status quo.

References

External links
What Scotland Thinks

Opinion polls
Scotland
Independence referendum
Opinion polling about independence
Opinion polling for United Kingdom votes in the 2010s